Brother of CDO is a protein that in humans is encoded by the BOC gene.

CDON (MIM 608707) and BOC are cell surface receptors of the immunoglobulin (Ig)/fibronectin type III (FNIII; see MIM 135600) repeat family involved in myogenic differentiation. CDON and BOC are coexpressed during development, form complexes with each other in a cis fashion, and are related to each other in their ectodomains, but each has a unique long cytoplasmic tail.[supplied by OMIM]

Interactions
BOC (gene) has been shown to interact with CDON.

References

External links

Further reading